Leonardo Matias Rapadas, better known as Lenny Rapadas, is a Guamanian lawyer, who served as the  U.S. Attorney for the Districts of Guam and the Northern Mariana Islands from 2003 to 2010 and as the attorney general of Guam from 2011 to 2015.

Biography
He is the son of Danilo K. Rapadas and Cerila Matias Rapadas. He has three brothers, Danilo Jr., Antonio, and Juan, and three sisters, Roberta, Christina, and Ciony. 

Rapadas was nominated by President Bush and confirmed by the Senate as the United States Attorney for Guam and the Northern Mariana Islands, serving from May 2003 until June 2010.

He was elected Guam AG in 2010, replacing John Weisenberger. Rapadas was sworn in on January 3, 2011, in Agana.  He failed reelection against Elizabeth Barrett-Anderson by a wide margin in the November 2014 general election.

On 10 January 2016, Rapadas called for the FBI to investigate the controversial retroactive pay raises for the staff of the Guam Governor's office.

Personal life 
He is married to Cynthia Cruz has two children and 2 grandchildren.

References

External links
 Guam Bar Association Member Page
 Biography from the National Association of Attorneys General

Living people
Year of birth missing (living people)
Guamanian lawyers
American lawyers
Willamette University College of Law alumni
Attorneys General of Guam